The women's 1500 metres race of the 2016 World Single Distances Speed Skating Championships was held on 14 February 2016.

Results
The race was started at 15:14.

References

Women's 1500 metres
World